Angakauitai is an island of the Gambier Islands of French Polynesia. It has an area of 0.7 km2 and its highest point is at 139 m. It is administratively part of the Gambier Islands. It is uninhabited.

See also

 Desert island
 List of islands

References

Islands of the Gambier Islands
Uninhabited islands of French Polynesia